Area 51 is a secret military facility in Nevada, north of Las Vegas.

Area 51 may also refer to:

Places
 Area 51, troop barracks and MWR building on Camp Victory, Baghdad, Iraq

Games
 Area 51 (series)
 Area 51 (1995 video game), a light gun game developed by Atari
 Area 51: Site 4, a 1998 sequel to the original
 Area 51 (2005 video game), a first-person shooter game by Midway Austin

Literature
 Area 51: An Uncensored History of America's Top Secret Military Base, a 2011 book by Annie Jacobsen
 Area 51, a science-fiction novel by Bob Mayer under the pseudonym Robert Doherty

Other uses
 Area 51 (film), a 2015 film by Oren Peli
 Area 51, a staging zone for new Q&A websites, part of the Stack Exchange Network
 Area-51, a line of gaming computers from Dell subsidiary Alienware

See also

 
 Area 52 (disambiguation)
 Area (disambiguation)
 51 (disambiguation)
 Hangar 18 (disambiguation)